Singapore has submitted films for the Academy Award for Best International Feature Film on a fairly regular basis since 2005, although they submitted a film while still being a British colony in 1959. The award is handed out annually by the Academy of Motion Picture Arts and Sciences (AMPAS) to a feature-length motion picture produced outside the United States that contains primarily non-English dialogue. The academy selection committee reviews all the submitted films, and secret ballot voting is used to determine the five nominees.

, a total of fifteen films have been submitted for the Academy Award for Best Foreign Language Film, but none has yet received an Oscar nomination. The director whose films have been submitted the most is Eric Khoo, although none had been nominated; one was disqualified for being more than 50% in English and not in a Foreign Language. Two other submissions were large-scale musicals: the 1959 musical-drama The Kingdom and the Beauty, as well as the 2007 881.

List of submissions

See also

 List of Academy Award winners and nominees for Best Foreign Language Film
 List of Academy Award-winning foreign language films
 Cinema of Singapore

Notes

References

External links
 The Official Academy Awards Database
 The Motion Picture Credits Database
 IMDb Academy Awards Page

Best Foreign Language Film Academy Award submissions by country
Academy Award